("practice", "dress or "clothes"), also known as  or , is a traditional uniform worn for training in Japanese martial arts and their derivatives.

Origin
Japanese martial arts historian Dave Lowry speculates that Kanō derived the uniform's design from the uniforms of Japanese firefighters' heavy hemp jackets, .

Until the 1920s, Okinawan karate practice was usually performed in everyday clothes. Given the social climate between the Japanese and Okinawans during this time, karate was seen as brutish compared to Japanese martial arts, which had their roots in samurai culture, such as jujutsu. To help market karate to the Japanese, Gichin Funakoshi – the founder of Shotokan karate and the instructor responsible for importing karate to mainland Japan – adopted a uniform style similar to Kanō's design.

Construction

In competitive judo, one contestant wears a white uniform, and their opponent wears a blue one.

Commonly used  include:

 , aikido uniform)
 Brazilian Jiu-Jitsu gi/kimono (Brazilian Jiu-Jitsu uniform)
 , Korean martial arts uniform
 , judo uniform
 , jujutsu uniform
 , karate uniform
   Sambo uniform
 , Vietnamese martial arts uniform

In this, it is similar to the term for Korean martial arts uniforms, .

materials
 Single weave: A lighter material, cooler for use in the summer.
 Double weave: A very thick material, not as cool as other weaves.
 Gold weave: Between a single and double weave thickness; gold weave was initially required by the International Brazilian Jiu-Jitsu Federation in order to standardize  for competitions.
 Platinum weave: Lighter than gold weave, cooler for use in the summer.

Notes

References

See also

External links

 
1920s fashion
Japanese martial arts terminology
Martial arts uniforms
Uniforms
Japanese words and phrases